Bellilinea is a thermophilic bacteria genus from the family of Anaerolineaceae with one known species (Bellilinea caldifistulae). Bellilinea caldifistulae has been isolated from thermophilic digester sludge from Niigata in Japan.

References

Chloroflexota
Bacteria genera
Monotypic bacteria genera